Ackles is a surname. Notable people with the surname include:

Bob Ackles (1938–2008), Canadian football executive
David Ackles (1937–1999), American singer-songwriter
David Ackles (album), self-titled album
George Ackles (born 1967), American professional basketball player
Jensen Ackles (born 1978), American television actor
Jill Ackles, American television director
Margie Ackles (1939–2019), American figure skater

 See also
 Eccles (surname)

 Other uses
 ACLs, acronym for access-control lists

ru:Экклз